Alec Holland  is a fictional character in comic books published by DC Comics. He is most notably a character in the various Swamp Thing series.

Holland appeared in his first live adaptation in the 1982 film played by Ray Wise. Dick Durock took over the role in the sequel film The Return of Swamp Thing along with playing Holland. Durock continued playing the character in the 1990 television series along with playing the Swamp Thing. The character was played by Andy Bean in the television series for the DC streaming service.

Publication history
Alec Holland first appeared in Swamp Thing #1 (October-November 1972), created by writer Len Wein and artist Bernie Wrightson.

Fictional character biography
In a secret facility located in the Louisiana bayous, scientist Alec Holland and his wife Linda invent a bio-restorative formula that can solve any nations' food shortage problems. Two thugs working for Nathan Ellery, head of the criminal organization the Conclave, barge into Alec's lab, knock him out, and plant a bomb in the facility. Alec wakes up as the bomb explodes. In flames, he runs into the swamp. His body is drenched in the bio-restorative formula, and this affects the plant life of the swamp, imbuing it with Alec's consciousness and memories. The newly conscious plant life forms a semblance of a human and rises up from the bog as the Swamp Thing, the latest in a long line of Earth elementals created when the Green is in need of protection.

The Swamp Thing originally thinks that he is Alec Holland, transformed by the freak accident into a monster. He seeks to regain his human body, but often meets opposition in the form of Anton Arcane and his ever-growing legion of "Un-Men". After finally defeating Arcane, the Swamp Thing is set upon by General Sunderland's men in a covert military operation. The resulting attacks blast a hole in the Swamp Thing's head and destroys the lives of many of his friends. Sunderland brings the Swamp Thing's body back to Sunderland Corp to study and unlock the secret of the bio-restorative formula.

Sunderland hires the Floronic Man to study the Swamp Thing's body, which he stores in a cryochest. Over the course of his research, the Floronic Man deduces that the Swamp Thing is a plant that thinks it is Alec Holland; the real Alec Holland died in the explosion. Sunderland and the Floronic Man part on bad terms, so the scientist uses Sunderland's automated computer systems to raise the thermostat in the Swamp Thing's cryochest. This allows the Swamp Thing's body to regenerate, and in his search for Sunderland, he stumbles across the Floronic Man's report, which sends him into a mindless rage. He kills Sunderland and sets off for the swamps.

The Swamp Thing goes into shock from learning his true origins. He roots himself into the swamp and spends three weeks dreaming; his mind eventually travels into the Green. The Floronic Man returns to the swamp and discovers the Swamp Thing's connection to the Green, but the experience drives him mad. Consuming parts of Swamp Thing's body (which regenerate themselves or are basically superfluous to his continued existence), Floronic Man is able to influence plant growth to the extent all plants on Earth essentially become hostile to humanity. When the Swamp Thing realizes the presence of the Floronic Man's corrupting influence there, he wrenches himself back into reality. He catches up with the Floronic Man and convinces the villain that his war against animal life is pointless, reminding him that plant life and animal life need each other to survive.

A budding friendship grows between the Swamp Thing and Abby Cable, the niece of his dead nemesis Anton Arcane. Her husband Matthew grows resentful of her disinterest in sex and turns to alcohol, further pushing her toward the Swamp Thing. She asks for his help when her autistic students at Elysium Lawns are tormented by Kamara the Monkey King. The Swamp Thing destroys the demon with the help of Etrigan the Demon. On the same night that the demon attacks, Matthew leaves to help Abby. His alcoholism causes him to crash his car, mortally wounding him. To stay alive, he makes a pact with the spirit of Anton Arcane, who possesses his body.

Later, the Swamp Thing is visited by the ghost of Alec Holland and learns that Alec's skeleton is still lying at the bottom of the bayou. Diving down, the Swamp Thing retrieves the bones and gives them a proper burial. This allows Alec's spirit to free itself from the Earthly plane and ascend into Heaven.

After weeks, Abigail realizes that the man she thought was her husband is actually her Uncle Anton. Her feeling of disgust sends her into a horrible shock. The Swamp Thing confronts the possessed Matthew, and with the guidance of the monster, discovers Abby's body. Enraged that Arcane sent the "soul" of his niece to Hell, the Swamp Thing beats Arcane to a pulp, allowing Matthew's trapped spirit to cast the soul of the sorcerer out of his body and back to the netherworld. The returns Matthew's control of his body but leaves him comatose.

To set things right, the Swamp Thing travels into the Green, the Spirit World, and Hell, all to reclaim Abby's soul. He is forced to fight off a legion of the damned, including Anton Arcane, but he prevails again with the help of Etrigan. After Abby returns to life, the Swamp Thing and Abby confess their love for each other. To celebrate the beginning of their relationship, the Swamp Thing grows hallucinogenic tubers for Abby to eat, enabling her to see the world as he does.

The Swamp Thing's body is destroyed after an encounter with Nukeface, a man saturated by dangerous levels of radiation. He sends his mind into the Green to attempt to form another body, and with Abby's help and weeks of effort, the Swamp Thing reforms most of his new body. In the meantime, occultist John Constantine the Hellblazer hears news of a coming danger and finds his way to the swamp. Upon meeting the Swamp Thing, he informs the creature that it is a plant elemental. Constantine hints at knowing much more about the nature of the Swamp Thing than he is saying and promises to discuss the matters further if the Swamp Thing meets him in Rosewood, Illinois, in a week's time.

Constantine informs the Swamp Thing that he has not completely destroyed the vampire population of Rosewood during his last encounter with them, and a number of them adapted to live within an aquatic environment. The Swamp Thing remembers that running water can destroy the vampires; they can only live underwater because the body of water covering Rosewood is stagnant. To deal with them, the Swamp Thing extends his abilities further than ever before, forming a new body from a mountain and letting its river merge with Rosewood's, thereby wiping the vampires out. Rather than provide any new information, Constantine tells the Swamp Thing to meet him in Maine in two weeks' time.

In Kennescook, Maine, the Swamp Thing encounters Phoebe, a werewolf filled with outrage on behalf of abused and oppressed women throughout history. He prevents her from killing her husband, but is forced to watch helplessly as she kills herself. Constantine arrives soon after and tells the Swamp Thing to go back home to Louisiana.

Abby finds work on the set of a soap opera being filmed on the old Robertaland Plantation. Things went awry when the lead actors became possessed by the spirits of the murderous landowners. Dead slaves that worked on the plantation rose from the grave as zombies. Sensing the evil there, the Swamp Thing burns Robertaland to the ground after realizing that it is the source of their power.

Eventually, the Swamp Thing sees a pattern emerging in all the monstrosities he has been confronting across America, but admits he needs Constantine to explain it to him. Constantine instructs him to travel to San Miguel, California, promising that this will be the last leg of their mission before he reveals everything that he knows.

Crisis on Infinite Earths

In San Miguel, the Swamp Thing visits the abandoned Cambridge mansion, haunted by every person ever to have been killed by the Cambridge repeater firearm. A group of thrill-seekers were menaced by the ghosts. The Swamp Thing managed to exorcise the ghosts from the mansion by making the sound of a hammer on a big table within. Afterward, Constantine appears and explained that he wanted the Swamp Thing to see first-hand the effects that the coming Crisis is having on Earth.

The Swamp Thing and Constantine witnesses the effects of the Crisis: blood-red skies, and people and beasts from many different time periods, displaced into the present day. The pair were suddenly teleported to the Monitor's satellite by Alexander Luthor Jr. Constantine introduced the Swamp Thing to Alexander, who had formed a plan to ensure that reality survived the Crisis. Constantine promised that the Swamp Thing would likewise ensure that the spiritual realms survived the aftereffects of the Crisis.

Constantine revealed that after the Crisis ended, reality would be unstable and vulnerable for a time. Meanwhile, the ancient cult of the Brujeria were taking advantage of this situation in order to summon the Shadow Creature which would destroy Heaven. To do so the Brujeria needed to encourage a worldwide belief in monsters and the darker things in life. They were the ones responsible for the rash of nightmarish incidents that the Swamp Thing had contained over the past few weeks.

He plans for he and the Swamp Thing to travel to South America and battle the cult - but first he wants the Swamp Thing to visit the Parliament of Trees in Tefé, Brazil, where he promises that he would finally learn the truth about his nature as a plant elemental. The Swamp Thing bids farewell to Abby for a while, and as they kissed, they are unaware that amateur photojournalist Howard Fleck is taking pictures of them.

The Swamp Thing travels to Brazil, where he meets the Parliament of Trees. There, he encounters one of the previous plant elementals, Alex Olsen. Olsen explained that the Swamp Thing is the latest in a long line of plant elementals, who had all since joined the Parliament in their retirement. Communing with the others, the Swamp Thing is able to learn the histories of his predecessors.

Joining up with Constantine, the Swamp Thing manages to destroy the Brujeria by flooding their caves with dirt and crushing them with tree roots. His decision to save Constantine's life provided the Brujeria with enough time to send their messenger to awaken the Shadow Creature. Constantine and the Swamp Thing scramble to come up with a plan to deal with the Great Evil Beast, and then split up.

The Swamp Thing travels through the Green to the afterlife, recruiting the help of Deadman, the Phantom Stranger, the Spectre and Etrigan. Together, they prepare to make a stand against the Great Evil Beast in Hell. One by one, the Swamp Thing's allies fell to the Beast, failing to answer its questions - that is, until the Swamp Thing tries entering it of his own free will, with peaceful intent.

Reflecting on what the Parliament taught him about nature, he offered insights to the Great Evil Beast that its place in the universe is necessary; that good would grow stronger by its opposition to evil. His talk sparks something in the Great Evil Beast. When it finally reaches Heaven, the Great Evil Beast and the Presence join in an alliance of balance, changing the nature of good and evil for the entire universe.

Back in Louisiana, the Swamp Thing met with John Constantine again. The Swamp Thing is distressed to learn that in his absence, Howard Fleck had released the photos of him and Abby, causing such a scandal that she ran away to Gotham City. The Louisiana police had charged her with obscenity and crimes against nature, and it became Gotham's job to hold her trial and extradite her.

The Swamp Thing sped to Gotham in order to free Abby from jail. He burst into the Gotham courthouse and demanded Abby's release. When his demand is refused, he tapped into the Green, using his immense elemental power to cause Gotham to become overgrown with plant life. In this way, he kept the city hostage until his wife is released.

In the meantime, the Batman asked the Swamp Thing to turn Gotham back to normal, and the refusal of the creature leads to a fight in which the much-outmatched Batman is defeated. Finally, the Batman convinces the mayor that Abby had not committed any crime, and that it would be in the best interest of everyone if charges against her were dropped. In response, the Swamp Thing removes the overgrowth from Gotham.

As the Swamp Thing is about to be reunited with Abby, he is attacked by Dwight Wicker and the Defense Department Intelligence, who wants to avenge the death of General Sunderland. They cut him off from the Green using a communications scrambler provided by Lex Luthor. Then, they set him aflame with napalm.

Locked out of the Green's frequency, the Swamp Thing survives the attempted assassination by tuning into a different, alien one. He managed to grow a new body on a planet populated by only blue vegetation, unconnected to the Green. He stayed on the planet for a time, exploring it and even creating plant-replicas of people he knew from Earth to keep him company. Finding this to be ultimately pointless, he destroyed his creations and gathered up the courage to try and grow a new plant-body elsewhere in the universe.

He finds his way to the planet Rann, where he meets and befriends Adam Strange. The planet is going through a devastating drought, and there were arrangements made to find a solution with the Thanagarians. The Swamp Thing reached down under the surface of the planet and brought its plant life back.

He attempted to grow a body from vegetation on a planet which seemed to be techno-organic. However, unbeknownst to him, the planet is sentient, and sought to mate with him. The entity forced the Swamp Thing to mate with her, and afterwards the Swamp Thing swiftly fled across the universe to find a new place to grow a body.

Finally, the Swamp Thing found his way to the planet J586, where all plant life is sentient. With the help of Green Lantern Medphyll, the Swamp Thing learned to shift his frequency, so that he could return to Earth and the Green.

Before reuniting with Abby at last, the Swamp Thing murdered the men responsible for the assassination attempt.

The Sprout
After settling down again with Abby in the swamp, the Swamp Thing traveled to the Parliament of Trees, but is greeted with surprised horror. The Parliament had assumed him dead, and had therefore begun to grow a sprout which would grow into a new elemental, once bound with a human spirit. The upshot of which being that having two elementals active at one time would set the balance of nature awry and cause calamity. The Parliament gave him the choice to either take root in the Parliament, and leave Abby forever, or to kill the Sprout. The Swamp Thing refused to do either, whatever the consequences.

Eventually, the Swamp Thing and Constantine concocted a plan by which they would bind the Sprout to a human host so that he could retire to be with Abby until it is time for him to join the Parliament.

The Sprout attempted to bind with Solomon Grundy in Slaughter Swamp, but the monster resisted, eventually bathing in toxic chemicals in order to force the Sprout out. During his encounter with Grundy, the Swamp Thing realized that the Parliament is trying to kill him in order to restore balance, given that he would not kill the Sprout.

He returned to the Parliament, and demanded to speak with a committee, to find a solution for the Sprout problem. In communing with the members, he discovered that across time, there have been hundreds of elementals, all of whom were once humans that were killed by fire. The meeting is a trap and as he experienced pasts of the committee members, he began to take root.

At the same time, the Sprout attempted to bind with an insane, evil man named Alan Bolland who had just died in the midst of a terrorist attack. The Parliament sensed the evil within Bolland, and it shocked the Swamp Thing out of his hypnosis. He used his frequency shifting abilities to force the committee members out into space, and the resulting chaos forced the Sprout from Bolland's body.

Constantine's contacts seemed to indicate that the Parliament's predictions were right: something is wrong with the balance of nature. Using his contacts, he arranged to find out where and when the next candidate for binding with the Sprout would be ready. Constantine arranged to help reconcile an average man named Gary Holland with the idea of becoming the next Swamp Thing, as his plane is destined to crash with no survivors. Meanwhile, the Swamp Thing had hidden the Sprout on the Moon. Upon his return through the Green, he encountered the lost souls of those on the crashed plane, and guided them all to Heaven - including his intended replacement. There would have to be another plan.

The pair went through several other failed attempts, going so far as to try to bond the Sprout with the Swamp Thing's friend Chester Williams. Fortunately, that is not required. The Swamp Thing decided, at Abby's urging, to grow himself a more powerful brain in order to solve the dilemma. After one and a half months of deliberation, he managed to find a solution.

The Swamp Thing used his abilities to take control of a somewhat unwilling Constantine's body, displacing Constantine into the astral plane. Then, in that human form, the Swamp Thing and Abby finally consummated their relationship, conceiving a child for the sprout to bond to. In the body of a child, the Sprout would be given the chance to learn at a slower rate.

Despite seemingly having found happiness with his wife, the Swamp Thing is soon set upon by the Dominators. Given that their weaponry is of a plant-based nature, they knew they had to eliminate the one being on Earth who could easily render them toothless in their intended invasion. In order to dispose of him, the Dominators used a device to displace the Swamp Thing in time.

The Swamp Thing found himself within the body of a soldier during the Second World War in 1945. There, he encountered a young Anton Arcane, using an abattoir as his lab for the creation of his Un-Men. Arcane used an artifact known as the Claw of Aelkhünd to send the Swamp Thing further back in time.

The Swamp Thing is then occupying the body of a downed French pilot during the First World War. There, he met Abby's grandmother Anaïs Arcane, who called on her young doctor son, Anton, to treat his wounds. Naturally, Anton's interest in the Swamp Thing's biology is less than medical, and the result of their encounter faced the Swamp Thing with the Claw again, sending him further back.

He next awakes in the Old West in 1872, where he is trapped within a large chunk of amber. Eventually, a team of heroes, including Bat-Lash and Hawk Haukins, managed to free him. Hopefully, the Swamp Thing arranged to have his photo taken with them, thinking that his pregnant wife might see him, and know he is okay. Knowing he had to go back further, he willingly faced the Claw again.

The Swamp Thing became trapped again in a piece of amber, falling into the hands of Tomahawk, the Old West hero. Another exposure to the Claw sent him back to medieval times when he encountered Merlin, the Shining Knight, and an item believed to be the Holy Grail.

Further back, the Swamp Thing encountered a tribe of early men, who lived in harmony with the Green, but they were killed by a younger, more violent race of men in the Ice Age. Before dying, a shaman that the Swamp Thing befriended gave to him three seeds, and stored the spirits of his people away within a piece of amber - which sent the Swamp Thing back further still.

The Swamp Thing arrived at a time when man had not yet been born. He encountered three of his predecessors; Yggdrasil (the tree of life), Tuuru (the tree of knowledge), and Eyam. They explained that they were the three founders of the Parliament of Trees, and sent him back once more into the past.

In a world desolate and devoid of life, the Swamp Thing grew his brain large once more, and realized that it is he who created the Parliament, and began the succession of Earth elementals. He planted one of the three seeds he is given, which later grew into Yggdrasil, imbuing it with a map of all his knowledge. Then, he allowed a flow of lava to overtake him, converting the sap within his enlarged brain to amber.

Finally, the Swamp Thing realized that the reason that he is sent back in time by the Claw is that the chunk of amber within it is a future version of himself. He waited millennia for the day when John Constantine would find his way to the present day location of the Claw, and release him.

Finally freed, the Swamp Thing arrives home just in time to witness the birth of his daughter, Tefé Holland.

The Swamp Thing is unaware when he chose Constantine as the surrogate for the conception of his daughter that he had received a blood transfusion from the demon Nergal. Likewise, he is unprepared for the fact that the powers of his daughter extend to both the Green and the Red. One day, when she witnesses him disappearing into the Green, she tries to do the same, and in the process, destroys her human body.

Tefé's astral form traveled through the spirit world until it ended up on the outskirts of Hell. There, she caught the attention of the demon Beelzebub, not to mention Anton Arcane who managed to gain lowly demon status by way of his evil ways. Arcane is assigned to Nergal, who recognized his own taint within Tefé. Through this taint, the demons hoped to gain control of her, although the child became the center of a political struggle in Hell between the Spider Guild, Beelzebub and Azazel.

The Swamp Thing entered the spirit world, where he encountered a number of alien spirits who were stuck in the human afterlife after the Dominators' attack. Together, they traveled to Hell. There, Etrigan explained the truth about Tefé's demon taint. Confronting Nergal, it seemed as though the Swamp Thing was no match for him. Later, Arcane's machinations had connected Tefé to the irrigation system of the whole city, and when she opened a window back to Earth, it caused the destruction of the city and all the demons within.

The destruction of Nergal's garden released a particular spirit on Earth. It is Matango, a fungus-based lifeform. Meanwhile, the Swamp Thing and his wife search for a way to get Tefé back into a physical body. With Constantine's help, they determine that she must be the one to recreate the body herself, but without any knowledge of anatomy, she would not be able to do so properly.

A shaman clued the Swamp Thing in to the existence of a fountain in the Garden of Eden which can allow any being the ability to understand all languages. With this, Tefé could understand how to rebuild her own body with instruction. The Swamp Thing met with the Parliament of Trees to find out the location of the fountain. There, he reunited with Yggdrasil, Eyam, and Tuuru, who explained that much of what he had been taught in the past is a ruse in order to bring about the birth of a plant-human hybrid: Tefé.

Yggdrasil explains that by planting the first of the three seeds, the Swamp Thing brought about the birth of the Parliament. The second became his vessel forward through time. The third is consumed by Tefé - and that is what awakened Matango. The seed represented the ways of the old race of man, who were in communion with nature. The newer, more violent race of men served Matango's needs better.

The Parliament had once resided in the Garden of Eden, but a war with Matango and the fungus-based life force known as the Gray forced them out. The fountain is still to be found in the ruins of Eden, which lies in what became known as Antarctica. The Swamp Thing traveled there, rescuing Eyam's trapped soul, collecting a frozen shard of the waters of the fountain, and narrowly escaping destruction by the angels who protected the ruins.

As a hurricane threatened all of Louisiana the Swamp Thing returned, giving Tefe the water from the fountain. With the help of Constantine's friend Brenda and the shaman of Sarga, Tefé is able to rebuild most of her body, but Matango had assembled an army of servants of the Gray to capture the infant. The new body she grew became corrupted with mold and fungus, prompting the Swamp Thing to destroy it, as the hurricane swept over the swamp, and destroyed everything in sight.

The next morning, the Swamp Thing and his family decided to take Tefé to the Parliament of Trees for her protection.

The Quest for the Elementals
Upon their arrival at the Parliament of Trees, Yggdrasil helped recreate Tefé's body for them. The Parliament then explained to the Swamp Thing that Matango was once the 13th in the line of plant elementals, and the last to share in the secret knowledge of the Parliament's creation via a time loop. When Matango was protector of the Green, a meteor formed by the destruction of a planet that is home to the Gray landed on Earth. Matango volunteered to host the new lifeform in order to learn more about it. His own ambition was corrupted by the Gray's drive to consume, and he became its agent.

A war broke out between the Green and the Gray, which forced the elementals to leave Eden. In order to have a compromise, the Parliament caused an Ice Age that allowed the new race of man to conquer the old race, so that in time, if man caused the downfall of the Green, the Gray could take its place. By giving a seed of the old race to his daughter, the Swamp Thing caused the balance to be offset. The Parliament decided that in order to save the Green, they needed to confront Matango.

The Swamp Thing began to amass an army of those elementals trapped by the Gray during the war. Matango anticipated this, and all of the efforts were in vain, leading to the Swamp Thing's capture and imprisonment, deep in the Pacific Ocean. The Swamp Thing risked the death of all those imprisoned by attempting to form a body there, but is successful, with the help of others.

They return to the Parliament, where they learned that Matango had ensnared Abby and Tefé. Climbing the rotting trunk of Yggdrasil, he reaches them and set them free before heading onward to Matango's lair. Discovering that Matango's weakness is his old Green form, the Swamp Thing used his own skin against him, and severed his connection to the Gray.

The Gray finds a new, more neutral vessel, who promises that he will wait until the Green's time has passed before allowing the Gray to inherit Earth.

After a time of being able to live happily with his family, the Swamp Thing becomes aware of the resurgence of the Sunderland Corporation as a threat to the environment. Now run by General Sunderland's daughter Constance, the Sunderland Corporation took on a personal vendetta against the Swamp Thing while pursuing its greedy, destructive interests.

Meanwhile, Tefé's power over both plants and flesh became a matter of concern for her parents when she showed a tendency to horribly mangle and kill those who angered her. When she killed the family cat in anger, it is decided that the Swamp Thing would consult the Parliament of Trees for help. The Parliament sent Lady Jane to act as Tefé's governess, allowing the Swamp Thing to focus his attention on protecting the Green.

Eventually, in Hell, Lucifer abdicated his rule, allowing many of the demons trapped there to escape - including Anton Arcane. Arcane returned to the land of the living with intent to possess Tefé's body, and cause pain to his niece Abigail. Arcane's attempted coup is thwarted by the appearance of Agony and Ecstacy, but he vowed to return.

When Constance Sunderland had an occultist named Doctor Polygon resurrect her father from death, it provided Anton Arcane with a body to host his spirit. Using Sunderland's influence and his own power, Arcane managed to terrorize his niece once again.

With the threat of Anton Arcane's return, Abigail makes the Swamp Thing promise to stay with her and their daughter in order to protect them and be a husband and father. Reluctantly, he agrees - but the Parliament of Trees is displeased with the decision. When a great threat to the environment and the Green appeared, the Swamp Thing is forced to choose between breaking his promise to Abby or allowing the Green to suffer. Ultimately, he chose neither, and created a double of himself to look after his family while he protected the Green. He had intended to return to his family once the threat was taken care of, but the Parliament prevented it - leaving his double to become firmly entrenched as the family man he could not be.

After being away for two weeks, the Swamp Thing's body is restored, but with an altered appearance. The toxins gone, he returns to Louisiana to reunite with his family, but the double that he created believes that he is more worthy to be with Abby and Tefé than the Swamp Thing, and they fought. When the Swamp Thing realizes that the double is not merely a copy, but a part of him, the Swamp Thing absorbs it back into his body. Abby is disgusted when she realized his deceit, and decides to leave him and move to New Orleans with Chester Williams.

The Swamp Thing is among the heroes who attend a memorial service for Green Lantern Hal Jordan. As a tribute to Hal and the destroyed Coast City, the Swamp Thing turns the barren city into a lush garden.

Brightest Day

Alec Holland returns to life by the Entity within the White Lantern, while the Swamp Thing has become a being of mindless destruction. Alec's last conscious memory was of hurling himself into the swamp to extinguish the flames engulfing him, having no memory of ever being the Swamp Thing previously. Constantine took it upon himself to seek the living Alec out, and force him to reunite with the Swamp Thing as one, returning its conscience. However, since he had been given his life back, Alec wanted to keep it, and John conceded, letting him live.

The Entity reveals Alec Holland as its champion and a missing, vital component of the Swamp Thing itself. Unlike the previous incarnation, a mass of humanoid plant life with all of Holland's absorbed memories, this new, renewed Swamp Thing was generated directly from the body of Alec Holland himself. The Entity imbued upon Holland all of the powers of the Green that the former had wielded, including the additional elemental governance over fire. As the Swamp Thing, Alec grew to an enormous height to battle the corrupted being. Upon defeating it, he restored the Green to its natural order.

The New 52

In DC Comics's company-wide reboot The New 52, Alec Holland is brought back to life, but is haunted by the memories of the Swamp Thing. Alec tries to put those memories behind him and live life as a carpenter in Louisiana, yet the Green continues to reach out for him. He is visited at work by Superman, who informs him of strange animal deaths across the world. Alec declines further investigating the matter as he explains to Superman his search for a normal life. He tells Superman how he tried returning to his botany work and successfully created a bio-restorative formula, but he also had a vision of a world covered in Green so he destroyed it. Later that night, Alec has nightmares of the Swamp Thing and awakes to find his room covered in plants. He runs outside, this time to truly destroy the formula which he kept, only to be stopped by the Swamp Thing.

The Swamp Thing reveals himself to be Calbraith A. H. Rodgers, a World War II pilot who was shot down but transformed by the Green into the Swamp Thing. Alec is reluctant to hear his message but allows him to speak. Rodgers tells Alec of the rise of Sethe and the Rot and Alec's importance as the next protector of the Green. Rodgers also confirms that the Swamp Thing of Alec's memories was not him and that Alec is destined to be the greatest protector of the Green, a warrior king. He dies to deliver this message to Alec and with his dying words warns Alec to stay away from the white-haired woman. Alec returns to his motel when the entire staff and guests have been turned into minions of the Rot. Alec is almost taken when he is saved by a woman on a motorcycle. She drives them off and pulls over revealing herself to be the woman with white hair, Abigail Arcane.

Abigail pulls over and demands that Alec "do something". She believes him to be the Swamp Thing and puts a gun to his head to make him prove it. Alec reacts as vines and roots apprehend Abby. He releases her and explains that he has the creature's memories but that he is not the Swamp Thing. Abby asks for his help in finding her half-brother, William Arcane, at a hospital in Texas. On the way Abby explains that the Rot calls to her the same way the Green calls for Alec, but when she is near it is weaker. They pull over to rest and Alec drifts of and goes into the Green. They warn him that the Rot is coming, that it will take over his world and that they have fought this war for millions of years and it is now Alec's turn to be the Swamp Thing. Alec claims they are close to stopping William Arcane but the Parliament insists it is Abigail who is the real threat and that he should kill her now. Alec wakes up to find Abby leaving and stops her. He argues to stay close to her and protect her and they continue towards William, who has taken over a slaughterhouse in Stocks, TX. While stocking up at a gun shop they are attacked by William and his reanimated monsters. Alec attacks with sharp vines and roots and impales or tears apart each of the monsters and restrains William in a tree. He rushes to Abby's aide and kisses her. William begins to celebrate and claims that they are doomed.

Alec immediately feels something wrong within the Green and feels them crying out in fear. Abby is covered in the Rot as it forms a cocoon around her. She begs him to run away and leave her as he does so, reluctantly. Alec is chased by flying creatures from the Rot and fends them off with a shotgun. He pulls over at the nearest swamp and calls for the Green to take him. They say it is too late and all is lost as Alec is impaled from behind with a chainsaw by a member of the Rot. As Alec lay dying, he begs for the Green to save him. The Green answers his call but only prolongs his death to extend his suffering. Even facing a horrible death, Alec continues to defend Abby to the Parliament of Trees. Alec claims that she will be able to refuse the Rot's call just as he was able to resist theirs. He states that it is human restraint that is coveted by the Parliament as they had lost that capacity long ago. Alec sees the Green as being no less violent and wild as the Red and the Rot. He asks that the Parliament use their last bit of power to get the bio-restorative formula from his bag and turn him into the Swamp Thing. Alec assures them he is only doing this to save Abby, though he knows he will once again be forever changed into the monster. The Parliament agrees to his plan, and breaks open the bio-restorative formula. Alec's human body is destroyed, and replaced with plant matter, as he emerges from the pod as the Swamp Thing, impaling all of his attackers with sharp vines and roots before growing wings and flying towards the Rot, declaring war.

Alec, as the new and improved Swamp Thing, flies into the Rot kingdom and confronts Sethe. Alec tells Sethe to release Abigail and he will "spare him some pain". Sethe laughs and sends his army of the undead after Alec. Alec manages to fight his way through walking corpses towards Sethe, but stops to see Abby crawl out of her cocoon in her new form. Alec tries to calm Abby down in her monstrous new form, but it does not work; Abby now only has one thought on her mind: "Alec needs to die".

Abby impales Alec as Seethe's army cheers on. Alec begs her to stop, but she is unable to control herself. Alec turns and commands Abby to stop and begins to reverse her transformation by using vanilla grown from orchid seeds he placed in peaches they shared earlier. He changes Abby back as Seethe unleashes on him. Abby stands and destroys Seethe and takes Alec away to treat his wounds. She takes Alec to a swamp where he has pulled the essence of the Parliament and started new trees. Alec and Abby share a kiss before he returns to sleep and heal in the swamp.

Rotworld
The Swamp Thing and Animal Man are tricked into entering the Rot in hopes to stop Arcane. Arcane had set a trap for them for as soon as they enter the Rot; a full year progresses in the world without their presence. This became known as the Rotworld. Arcane reveals his plan to Alec and Buddy and separates them in the Rotworld. Alec is found by Poison Ivy and Deadman who take him to the Parliament of Trees, the last living place in the world. Together they fight off an army of Rotlings led by the Rotworld's Teen Titans. The Swamp Thing grows himself into an immense size and crushes the Titans. Deadman and Alec head to Gotham City in search of a weapon to defeat the Rot. The Swamp Thing constructs a boat out of vegetation and sails to Gotham. They are attacked by William Arcane, armed with Aquaman's trident. He attacks them with Starro the Conqueror under his control. The Swamp Thing and Deadman are swallowed alive by Starro until Alec cuts him open from inside. Deadman sacrifices himself by taking control of William, which kills them both. Alec arrives in Gotham City, only to find the Batman already taken over by the Rot. He is being held by Barbara Gordon who has kept herself alive by ingesting the Man-Bat serum.

Barbara leads Alec to Arkham Asylum which is protected by a green dome powered by Mr. Freeze, Killer Croc and the Floronic Man. The Batman left Alec a sample of the bio-restorative formula along with a weaponized mech to deliver it.

The Brave and the Mold
The Swamp Thing returns to Gotham City at a murder scene where the Batman and Commissioner Gordon are present. He reveals to them that the man murdered was his father, Lloyd McGinn. Showing no sadness to the death of his father, he reveals to the Batman that he only met him once after he was transformed, and the reason he came was because he wanted to know why he came. The two team up to uncover the assassin, and soon find out that it was a serial killer known as the Headhunter.

Batman and the Swamp Thing encounter the Headhunter in an art gallery. He tells them that he met McGinn at a bar, singing a lullaby. He asked him what the song was about, to which McGinn responded it was about "life". McGinn asked if the Headhunter knew about life, and he responded negatively, saying that he maybe "knew something about death". McGinn said that life and death were the same thing. After the Headhunter asked what he meant by that, he said he did not know, but that was what his son, the Swamp Thing, told him. Envious because the man was related to a superhero and got "all the answers" that normal people could not get, the Headhunter discovered where he lived and killed him.

Infuriated, the Swamp Thing kills the Headhunter immediately, singing the same lullaby his father did. He reveals to the Batman that his father used to sing the song when he was scared as a child. The Batman gets angry, claiming he was used by the Swamp Thing. The Swamp Thing turns sad because of the distant relationship with his father, and says that the Batman does not understand. The Batman is offended by the statement that he does not understand. The Swamp Thing tells him that he believed the Batman was the reason he came, and because he knew that, he had no reason to stay. The Swamp Thing then disappears, leaving the Batman alone.

In other media

Television

Live-action
 Alec Holland / Swamp Thing appears in an anti-littering public service announcement that was aired on behalf of Greenpeace and coincided with the release of The Return of Swamp Thing.
 Alec Holland / Swamp Thing appears in a self-titled TV series (1990), with Dick Durock reprising the title role from the Swamp Thing films.
 It was rumored that Alec Holland / Swamp Thing would appear in a future episode of Constantine, but the show was cancelled before the rumor could be proven or disproven.
 Alec Holland / Swamp Thing appears in a self-titled TV series (2019), portrayed by Andy Bean and Derek Mears respectively. This version a disgraced scientist who manipulated test results to prove himself right. He is hired by businessman Avery Sunderland to investigate a virus plaguing Marais, Louisiana, though Holland believes that Sunderland's research is tied to the virus, and works with Abby Arcane to investigate further. Holland is shot by an unknown assailant and his boat is destroyed by dynamite. He dies from his wounds, but the swamp covers him in vines and transfers his memories to a plant that would later become the Swamp Thing.

Animation
 Alec Holland / Swamp Thing appears in a self-titled TV series (1991), voiced by Len Carlson.
 Alec Holland / Swamp Thing makes a cameo appearance in the Justice League episode "Comfort and Joy".
 Alec Holland / Swamp Thing appears in Justice League Action, voiced by Mark Hamill.
 Alec Holland / Swamp Thing appears in Harley Quinn, voiced by Sam Richardson. This version is a calm hipster with a man bun and several tiny flowers dotting his body. Additionally, he is a former associate of Poison Ivy's.

Film
 Alec Holland / Swamp Thing appears in a self-titled film, portrayed by Ray Wise and Dick Durock respectively. This version of Holland was turned into Swamp Thing by Anton Arcane during a laboratory accident.
 Alec Holland / Swamp Thing appears in The Return of Swamp Thing, portrayed again by Dick Durock. This version of Swamp Thing is Holland's consciousness reconstituted through plant life.
 Alec Holland / Swamp Thing appears in the DC Animated Movie Universe (DCAMU) series of films:
 He first appears in Justice League Dark, voiced by Roger R. Cross. In order to locate Felix Faust, the titular team goes to find the Swamp Thing, who agrees to transport them to Faust's observatory, but declines to join in the group's fight. When the Justice League tries to fight Destiny, John Constantine summons the Swamp Thing, who agrees to help, but he is defeated after Destiny takes Holland's corpse from his body.
 Swamp Thing makes a minor appearance in Batman and Harley Quinn, voiced by John DiMaggio.
 Swamp Thing appears in Justice League Dark: Apokolips War, voiced again by Roger R. Cross. He sacrifices himself to help Constantine destroy an Apokoliptian Reaper that Darkseid brought to Earth.
 The Alec Holland incarnation of Swamp Thing appears in Teen Titans Go! To the Movies.
 On January 31, 2023, a self-titled Swamp Thing horror film was announced to be in development at DC Studios. The following day, The Hollywood Reporter confirmed that James Mangold was in early talks to direct the film after the releases of Indiana Jones and the Dial of Destiny and his upcoming Bob Dylan biopic A Complete Unknown.

Video games
 Alec Holland / Swamp Thing appears in a self-titled video game.
 Alec Holland / Swamp Thing appears in DC Universe Online, voiced by Chilimbwe Washington.
 Alec Holland / Swamp Thing appears as a playable character in Lego Batman 3: Beyond Gotham, voiced by JB Blanc.
 Alec Holland / Swamp Thing appears as a playable character in Infinite Crisis, voiced by Michael Dorn.
 Alec Holland / Swamp Thing appears as a playable character in Injustice 2, voiced by Fred Tatasciore. In his non-canonical single-player ending, Swamp Thing reminds the planet of his presence by having trees and plants take over Earth's cities. In Raiden's single-player ending, Swamp Thing joins the newly formed Justice League Dark.
 Alec Holland / Swamp Thing appears as a playable character in Lego DC Super-Villains as part of the "Justice League Dark" DLC pack.

Miscellaneous
Alec Holland appears in issue #16 of The Batman Adventures. This version lives with the long-retired Pamela Isley and encounters a plant doppelganger she had created prior to keep Batman from locating her.

References

Characters created by Bernie Wrightson
Characters created by Len Wein
Comics characters introduced in 1972
DC Comics characters who are shapeshifters
DC Comics characters with superhuman strength
DC Comics deities
DC Comics fantasy characters
DC Comics male superheroes
DC Comics plant characters
DC Comics scientists
Fictional avatars
Fictional biologists
Fictional characters from Louisiana
Fictional characters with immortality
Fictional characters with superhuman durability or invulnerability
Fictional characters with plant abilities
Fictional chemists
Fictional monsters
Fictional superorganisms
Male horror film characters
Fiction about reincarnation